Margareta Xenopol (January 28, 1892 – July 8, 1979) was a Romanian composer, pianist and singer. She was born in Iași, the daughter of Alexandru Dimitrie Xenopol. She initially studied piano with Margareta Sakellary and Apasia Sion Burada, then studied with Walter Bachmann in Dresden, Germany. She studied voice with Alexandru Zirra, music theory with Paul Constantinescu, and composition with Martin Negrea in Bucharest. Romanian opera singer Elena Cernei recorded several of Xenopol's songs.

Works
Her compositions include:

Chamber 
Elegy (cello and piano)

Piano 
Classical Etude

Concert Etude (1947)

Dream of Columbine Waltz

Idyll (1912)

Melancholy Waltz

Prelude

Russian Suite (1950)

Sonatina

Theme and Variations

Vocal 
And for Your Black Eyes

Autumn Song

Blue Cigarette Smoke

(The) Days Pass, But the Love Remains

Four Romances

I Am Watching You

I Love Like I Never Loved

I Wanted to Run Away from You

Let's Go, Sailor (men's choir)

Nocturne

Prayer (text by Mihai Eminescu; choir)

Psalm 19 (choir)

Return

Romance of the Heart (text by Ion Minulescu)

Romances without Music

Three Romances

Why Do I Dream?

You Forget Romance

References 

Women classical composers
Romanian classical composers
1892 births
1979 deaths
Musicians from Iași
Romanian people of Greek descent